Eustace de Normanville (also Eustachius de Normanvyle) was an English medieval academic and university chancellor.

Eustace de Normanville was a Master of Arts and Doctor of Decrees. From 1276 to 1280, he was Chancellor of the University of Oxford.

References

Year of birth unknown
Year of death unknown
English legal scholars
Chancellors of the University of Oxford
13th-century English people